Hanky Panky is an album by American jazz pianist Hank Jones recorded in 1975 for the Japanese East Wind label.

Reception

Allmusic awarded the album 3 stars, stating: "All in all, an excellent offering from an undisputed master." On All About Jazz John Kelman said: "Jones is as elegant here as always. While totally steeped in the mainstream, he manages to buck convention in the subtlest of ways... Familiar? Yes, but with a sense of adventure that retains a freshness and undeniable sense of discovery."

Track listing
 "Nothin' Beats an Evil Woman" (Ray Rivera) - 3:48
 "Warm Blue Stream" (Sara Cassey, Dotty Wayne) - 4:40
 "Confidence" (Pete Vuolo) - 3:42
 "Wind Flower" (Cassey) - 5:31
 "Minor Contention" (Hank Jones) - 4:00
 "Favors" (Claus Ogerman) - 6:36
 "As Long as I Live" (Harold Arlen, Ted Koehler) - 5:47
 "Oh, What a Beautiful Mornin'" (Oscar Hammerstein II, Richard Rodgers) - 5:45
 "Hanky Panky" (Gary McFarland) - 4:38

Personnel 
Hank Jones - piano
Ron Carter - bass
Grady Tate - drums

References 

1975 albums
Hank Jones albums
East Wind Records albums